The 2014 Florida Gators softball team represented the University of Florida softball program during the 2014 NCAA Division I softball season.

Roster
The 2014 Florida Gators softball team has 2 seniors, 6 juniors, 5 sophomores, and 4 freshmen.

References

Florida Gators softball seasons
Florida Gators softball
Florida Gators softball
Florida
Women's College World Series seasons
NCAA Division I softball tournament seasons